Naked Josh is a Canadian comedy television series, which aired on Showcase from 2004 to 2006. It was created and written by Alex Epstein and Laura Kosterski. The show starred David Julian Hirsh as Josh Gould, a university professor in Montreal who, although he teaches a sexual anthropology course, struggles to understand the ever-shifting rules and expectations of the dating scene.

It premiered in the 2004–2005 television season with eight half-hour episodes, and aired for a total of three seasons. The show's first season briefly aired on the Oxygen Network in the United States.

The series received a Gemini Award nomination for Best Comedy Series at the 21st Gemini Awards in 2006.

Cast and characters
David Julian Hirsh as Josh Gould
Sarah Smyth as Natalie Bouchard
Patricia McKenzie as Jennifer Chopra
James A. Woods as Steve
Susan Glover as Sarah
Andrew Tarbet as Eric Kosciusko
Ruth Chiang as Claudia
Lucinda Davis as Angela

Directors
James Allodi
Paul Carrière
Jim Donovan
Tim Southam

Writers
Alex Epstein, co-creator and writer
Laura Kosterski, co-creator and writer
Matt MacLennan
Robert David Sheridan
Henri-Leon Solomon
Karen Hill

Episodes

Season 1 

 "The Sexual Contract"
 "Game, Setup, Match" 
 "Flirting with Disaster" 
 "Celibacy" 
 "Domme & Dommer" 
 "Do Not Resuscitate" 
 "The More the Merrier" 
 "Fun for the Whole Family"

Season 2 

 "Baring It All"
 "Damsel" 
 "The Artist and the Professor"
 "The Loneliness Long Distance"
 "The Thrill of the Chase"
 "Fake It Till You Make It"
 "Making It Work" 
 "What's the Rush?"

Season 3 

 "Man on the Ledge"
 "Who's Your Daddy?"
 "Just Say Mo"
 "Looking Good"
 "Name Your Price"
 "Pistols at Dawn"
 "Virgin Terrority"
 "Planned Parenthood"
 "Footprints"
 "Beating the Rap"

References

External links

 

2000s Canadian sitcoms
2004 Canadian television series debuts
2006 Canadian television series endings
Showcase (Canadian TV channel) original programming
Television series by Corus Entertainment
Television shows set in Montreal
Television shows filmed in Montreal